Omey is a civil parish in County Galway, Ireland.

Omey is one of 5 civil parishes in the barony of Ballynahinch in the Province of Connacht.

Omey civil parish comprises 72 townlands, which are listed as follows: Aillenaveagh, Ardmore, Ardmore Island, Atticlogh, Attigoddaun, Aughrus Beg, Aughrus More, Ballymaconry, Barnahallia, Barnanoraun, Belleek, Boolard, Boolard Island, Cartoorbeg, Claddaghduff, Clifden, Clifden Demesne, Cloghaunard, Cloon, Coolacloy, Couravoughil, Courhoor, Cregg, Cruagh, Cushatrough, Derreen, Doon, Eashal Island, Emlagh, Eyrephort, Fahy, Fakeeragh, Friar Island, Gannoughs, Glen, Glenbrickeen, Gooreen, Gooreenatinny, Gortrummagh, Grallagh, High Island, Hog Island, Inishturk, Kill, Knocakavilra, Knockavally, Knockbaun, Knockbrack, Laghtanabba, Leagaun, Letterdeen, Letternoosh, Lettershanna, Loughauna, Malthooa, Maw, Moorneen, Patches, Roeillaun, Rossadilisk, Rusheen, Shanakeever, Shinnanagh, Streamstown, Sturrakeen, Tievebaun, Tooraskeheen, Tooreen, Townaloughra, Trean, Tullyvoheen, and Turbot Island.

References 

Civil parishes of County Galway